Skew may refer to:

In mathematics
 Skew lines, neither parallel nor intersecting.
 Skew normal distribution, a probability distribution
 Skew field or division ring
 Skew-Hermitian matrix
 Skew lattice
 Skew polygon, whose vertices do not lie on a plane
 Infinite skew polyhedron
 Skew-symmetric graph
 Skew-symmetric matrix
 Skew tableau, a generalization of Young tableau
 Skewness, a measure of the asymmetry of a probability distribution
 Shear mapping

In science and technology
Skew, also synclinal or gauche in alkane stereochemistry
Skew ray (optics), an optical path not in a plane of symmetry
 Skew arch, not at a right angle

In computing
 Clock skew
 Transitive data skew, an issue of data synchronization

In telecommunications
 Skew (fax), unstraightness
 Skew (antenna) a method to improve the horizontal radiation pattern

Other uses
 Volatility skew, in finance, a downward-sloping volatility smile
 SKEW, the ticker symbol for the CBOE Skew Index

See also
 SKU or Stock-keeping unit